Salif Koné is a Malian sprinter. He competed in the men's 100 metres at the 1980 Summer Olympics.

References

External links
 

Year of birth missing (living people)
Living people
Athletes (track and field) at the 1980 Summer Olympics
Malian male sprinters
Olympic athletes of Mali
Place of birth missing (living people)
21st-century Malian people